is an above ground metro station located in Meitō-ku, Nagoya, Aichi Prefecture, Japan operated by the Nagoya Municipal Subway's Higashiyama Line. It is located 18.6 rail kilometers from the terminus of the Higashiyama Line at Takabata Station. This station provides access to Nagoya University of Arts and Sciences.

History
Kamiyashiro Station was opened on 10 December 1970. The wicket gates were automated to use the Manaca smart card system from 11 February 2011.

Lines

 (Station number: H20)

Layout
Kamiyashiro Station has two elevated opposed side platforms.

Platforms

External links
 Kamiyashiro Station official web site

References

Railway stations in Japan opened in 1970
Railway stations in Aichi Prefecture